Kenneth J. Grieb (April 3, 1939 – July 13, 2018) was an American professor from New York who taught at the University of Wisconsin–Oshkosh. He coordinated the university's Model United Nations team starting in 1968.

Bibliography 

Articles published by Kenneth J. Grieb include:

The United States and the Central American Federation (1967)
The Lind Mission to Mexico (1968)
The Causes of the Carranza Rebellion: A Reinterpretation (1968)
Reginald del Valle: A California Diplomat's Sojourn in Mexico (1968)
Warren G. Harding and the Dominican Republic U.S. Withdrawal, 1921–1923 (1969)
The Domestic Scene as a Key to Latin America (1969)
Discussion Summary (1969)
A Badger General's Foray into Diplomacy: General Edward S. Bragg in Mexico (1969)
American Involvement in the Rise of Jorge Ubico (1970)
The United States and General Jorge Ubico's Retention of Power (1971)
Standard Oil and the Financing of the Mexican Revolution (1971)
The United States and the Rise of General Maximiliano Hernandez Martinez (1971)
Area Studies and the Traditional Disciplines (1974)
Jorge Ubico and the Belice Boundary Dispute (1974)
Concentration of Political Power and Levels of Economic Development in Latin American Countries: A Comment and a Research Proposal (1974)
Sir Lionel Carden and the Anglo-American Confrontation in Mexico: 1913 – 1914 (1975)
A Brief Outline History of the Midwest Association for Latin American Studies (1975 with Robert L. Carmin and N. Merrill Rippy)
The Guatemalan Military and the Revolution of 1944 (1976)
History's Contribution to the Study of Social Revolution in Latin America (1976)
Guatemala and the Second World War (1977)
The Myth of a Central American Dictators' League (1978)
Guatemalan Caudillo: The Regime of Jorge Ubico, Guatemala – 1931–1944 (1979)

References 

1939 births
2018 deaths
University of Wisconsin–Oshkosh faculty
People from Buffalo, New York
University at Buffalo alumni
Indiana University alumni